KLSR-FM 105.3 FM is a radio station licensed to Memphis, Texas.  The station broadcasts a format consisting of Country music during the week and a variety of music on weekends. KLSR-FM is owned by Davis Broadcast Co., Inc.

References

External links
KLSR-FM's official website

LSR-FM
Country radio stations in the United States